Eric Ward may refer to:

Eric Ward (Australian footballer) (1913–2010), Australian rules footballer
Eric Ward (quarterback) (born 1987), gridiron football quarterback
Eric Ward (wide receiver) (born 1990), American football wide receiver
Eric Ward (The O.C.)